Presenting Red Mitchell is an album by American jazz bassist Red Mitchell recorded in 1957 and released on the Contemporary label.

Reception
The Allmusic review by Scott Yanow states "Bassist Red Mitchell, who had led two fairly obscure sessions for Bethlehem in 1955, came up with a gem on his lone Contemporary set as a leader ...the music is strictly high-quality modern mainstream bop of the era. Easily recommended to collectors of straight-ahead jazz".

Track listing
 "Scrapple from the Apple" (Charlie Parker) - 5:27
 "Rainy Night" (Red Mitchell) - 5:20
 "I Thought of You" (Mitchell) - 5:17
 "Out of the Blue" (Miles Davis) - 6:15
 "Paul's Pal" (Sonny Rollins) - 6:55
 "Sandu" (Clifford Brown) - 5:31
 "Cheek to Cheek" (Irving Berlin) - 8:06

Personnel
Red Mitchell - bass
James Clay - tenor saxophone, flute 
Lorraine Geller - piano
Billy Higgins - drums

References

Contemporary Records albums
Red Mitchell albums
1957 albums